Potamites ecpleopus, the common stream lizard , is a species of lizard in the family Gymnophthalmidae. It is found in Colombia, Ecuador, Bolivia, Brazil, and Peru.

References

Potamites
Reptiles described in 1875
Taxa named by Edward Drinker Cope